Anantnag Lok Sabha constituency is one of the five Lok Sabha (parliamentary)  constituencies in Jammu and Kashmir  in northern India.

Assembly segments
Anantnag Lok Sabha constituency is composed of the following 16 assembly segments:
 Tral
 Pampore
 Pulwama
 Rajpora
Wachi
Shopian
Noorabad
Kulgam
Hom Shali Bugh
Anantnag
Devsar
Dooru
Kokernag
Shangus
Bijbehara
Pahalgam

Members of Parliament

Election results

General Election 2019

General Election 2014

General Election 2009

General Election 2004

See also
 Anantnag–Rajouri Lok Sabha constituency
 Anantnag district
 Kulgam district
 Pulwama district
 Shopian district
 List of Constituencies of the Lok Sabha

References

Lok Sabha constituencies in Jammu and Kashmir
Anantnag district
Pulwama district
Shopian district
Kulgam district